Vernon Elementary School may refer to:
 Vernon Elementary School - Vernon, Arizona - Vernon Elementary School District
 Vernon School (formerly Vernon Elementary School) - Portland, Oregon - Portland Public Schools
 Vernon Elementary School - Vernon, Florida - Washington County School District

See also
 Vernon School (disambiguation)